Anna-Lisa Frykman, born Anna Elisabet Frykman in Stockholm, Sweden, was a Swedish composer, song lyricist and teacher. One of her most famous works is the children's song "Kungens lilla piga". and the Christmas song "Julpolskan". She was also active under the pseudonym "Eolus".

References 

1889 births
1960 deaths
20th-century Swedish musicians
Musicians from Stockholm
Swedish songwriters
Children's songwriters
Pseudonymous women writers
20th-century pseudonymous writers
Swedish lyricists